Minilimosina endrodyi is a species of lesser dung flies found in tropical Africa. It is the sole member of the subgenus Amediella.

References

Sphaeroceridae
Diptera of Africa